Diehlstadt is a village in Scott County, Missouri, United States. The population was 161 at the 2010 census. Diehlstadt was founded by John Kirkpatrick.

History
Diehlstadt was platted in 1868.  The original plat of Dielstadt filed on June 15, 1870, consisted of 40 acres.  The community of Diehlstadt was founded by Tennessee-born John Kirkpatrick (1829-1903) who was one of the community's first merchants and served as Diehlstadt's postmaster between May 11, 1876 and July 30, 1890.  The community was named after one H. J. Deal (also spelled Diehl), a German merchant, with the German-language suffix "stadt" meaning town.  A post office called Diehlstadt was established in 1870, and remained in operation until 1977.

Geography
The village is in southeast Scott County, approximately six miles southeast of the Mississippi River and nine miles northeast of Sikeston. It is located on Missouri Route 77, 2.5 miles north of U.S. Route 62.

Demographics

2010 census
As of the census of 2010, there were 161 people, 56 households, and 50 families living in the village. The racial makeup of the village was 98.76% White and 1.24% from two or more races.

There were 56 households, of which 42.9% had children under the age of 18 living with them, 71.4% were married couples living together, 12.5% had a female householder with no husband present, 5.4% had a male householder with no wife present, and 10.7% were non-families. 8.9% of all households were made up of individuals, and 3.6% had someone living alone who was 65 years of age or older. The average household size was 2.88 and the average family size was 3.00.

The median age in the village was 36.5 years. 26.1% of residents were under the age of 18; 11.8% were between the ages of 18 and 24; 21.2% were from 25 to 44; 27.4% were from 45 to 64; and 13.7% were 65 years of age or older. The gender makeup of the village was 47.8% male and 52.2% female.

2000 census
As of the census of 2000, there were 163 people, 61 households, and 48 families living in the village. The population density was 2,149.4 people per square mile (786.7/km2). There were 62 housing units at an average density of 817.6 per square mile (299.2/km2). The racial makeup of the village was 99.39% White and 0.61% Asian. Hispanic or Latino of any race were 2.45% of the population.

There were 61 households, out of which 37.7% had children under the age of 18 living with them, 62.3% were married couples living together, 9.8% had a female householder with no husband present, and 21.3% were non-families. 19.7% of all households were made up of individuals, and 11.5% had someone living alone who was 65 years of age or older. The average household size was 2.67 and the average family size was 2.98.

In the village, the population was spread out, with 28.8% under the age of 18, 8.6% from 18 to 24, 30.1% from 25 to 44, 22.1% from 45 to 64, and 10.4% who were 65 years of age or older. The median age was 36 years. For every 100 females, there were 94.0 males. For every 100 females age 18 and over, there were 93.3 males.

The median income for a household in the village was $24,375, and the median income for a family was $26,667. Males had a median income of $26,250 versus $17,917 for females. The per capita income for the village was $15,164. About 8.3% of families and 13.9% of the population were below the poverty line, including 5.1% of those under the age of 18 and 55.6% of those 65 or over.

References

External links
 Surname: Kirkpatrick, Scott County

Villages in Scott County, Missouri
Villages in Missouri